Satish Vasant Alekar (born 30 January 1949) is a Marathi playwright, actor, and theatre director. A founder member of the Theatre Academy of Pune, and most known for his plays Mahanirvan (1974), Mahapoor (1975), Atirekee (1990), Pidhijat (2003), Mickey ani Memsahib (1973), and Begum Barve (1979), all of which he also directed for the Academy. Along with Mahesh Elkunchwar and Vijay Tendulkar he is considered among the most influential and progressive playwrights in modern Marathi and Indian theatre.

He has also remained the head of Centre for Performing Arts, University of Pune (1996–2009), which he founded, after forgoing the Directorship of NSD and previously remained an adjunct professor at various universities in US, at the Duke University, Durhum, NC (1994), Performance Studies, Tisch School of the Arts, New York University as a Fulbright Scholar (2003). and Dept. Theatre and Film Studies, University of Georgia, Athens, GA (2005)

He was awarded the Sangeet Natak Akademi Award in Playwriting (Marathi) in 1994, by Sangeet Natak Akademi, India's National Academy of Music, Dance and Drama. He received the Padma Shri award in January 2012.
Since 2013 Satish Alekar is nominated by Savitribai Phule Pune University as Distinguished Professor on the campus. 
Recently he is also known for his screen acting in Marathi and Hindi feature films. He is seen in the character roles of films like Ventilator (2016).

Early life and education
Alekar was born in Delhi, India, but grew up in Pune, a center of Marathi culture in Maharashtra. He attended the  Marathi medium school New English School, Ramanbag which was established by Lokmanya Bal Gangadhar Tilak. After high school, he attended Fergusson College for his undergraduate Bsc degree in sciences. He received his master's degree in biochemistry from University of Pune in 1972.

Career

Theatre
Alekar gained his first stage experience as an actor in a college play. Impressed by his performance, director Bhalba Kelkar, who had set up the Progressive Dramatic Association, invited him to join it. Alekar wrote and directed his first one-act play Jhulta Pool in 1969. He became a part of a young circle that Jabbar Patel had started within the Progressive Dramatic Association.

This group split with the parent body in 1973 and set up Theater Academy in Pune. The split was over Vijay Tendulkar's play Ghashiram Kotwal. The senior members decided against its premiere in 1972, and Patel's group decided to produce it under the auspices of its own Theater Academy. Alekar assisted Patel in the direction of Ghashiram Kotwal, and the group has since mounted over 35 plays by him and manage to establish its foothold in experimental Marathi theatre.

Alekar conceived of and implemented Playwrights Development Scheme and Regional Theater Group Development. The Ford Foundation for Theater Academy, Pune supported these programs during 1985–1994.

Alekar has collaborated in several international play translation projects. The Tisch School of Arts at New York University invited him in 2003 to teach a course on Indian Theatre. The Department of Theater and Films Studies, University of Georgia invited him in 2005 to direct an English production of his play Begum Barve.

The Holy Cow Performing Arts Group in Edinburgh, Scotland performed an English version of Alekar's Micky And Memsahib on 27 and 28 August 2009 at Riddle's Court in Edinburgh Fringe Festival '09.

Other employment
Afterobtaining  his masters degree, Alekar worked as a research officer in Biochemistry at the government-run B. J. Medical College, Pune.
During July 1996 – January 2009, Ahe worked as a professor and the Head of the Center for Performing Arts(Lalit Kala Kendra) at University of Pune. He was working as the Honorary Director for a program supported by Ratan Tata Trust at the University of Pune during 2009–2011. During the period of  September 2013- September 2022 he  was  nominated by University of Pune as Distinguished Professor on the campus.

Plays

List of original Marathi मराठी plays written since 1973

 Micki Aani Memsaheb मिकी आणि मेमसाहेब  (1973)*
 Mahanirvan महानिर्वाण (1974)*
 Mahapoor महापूर (1975)
 Begum Barve बेगम बर्वे  (1979)*
 Shanwar Raviwar शनवार रविवार (1982)*
 Dusra Samana दुसरा सामना  (1987)
 Atireki अतिरेकी (1990)*
 Pidhijat पिढीजात (2003)*
Ek Divas Mathakade एक दिवस मठाकडे  (2012)
  Thakishi Sanvad' ठकीशी संवाद (2020) New Play written during COVID-19 lockdown (March–July 2020) to be produced in 2022-23

* Plays directed by Satish Alekar for Theatre Academy, Pune.
 Mahapoor (1975) Directed by Mohan Gokhale for Theatre Academy, Pune
 Dusra Samna (1987) Directed by Waman Kendre for Kala Vaibhav, Mumbai
 Ek Divas Mathakade (2012) Directed by Nipun Dharmadhikari for Natak Company, Pune

List of original Marathi मराठी  one-act plays
 Memory मेमरी  (1969)
 Bhajan भजन  (1969)
 Ek Zulta Pool एक झुलता पूल (1971)*
 Dar Koni Ughadat Naahi दर कोणी उघडत नाही (1979)
 Bus Stop बस स्टॅाप (1980)

List of adapted/translated one-act plays and Plays
 Judge जज्ज (1968)
 Yamuche Rahasya यमुचे रहस्य  (1976)
 Bhint भिंत  (1980)*
 Valan वळण (1980)*
 Pralay प्रलय (1985)* Marathi version of Gunther Grass's German Play The Flood
 Alshi Uttarvalyachi Gosht आळशी अत्तरवाल्याची गोष्ट (1999)**
 Nashibvan Baiche Don नशीबवान बाईचे दोन (1999)**
 Supari सुपारी (2002)
 Karmaachari कर्मचारी (2009)

** Directed by Satish Alekar for Lalit Kala Kendra ललित कला केंद्र  (Centre For Performing Arts, University of Pune)
* Directed for Theatre Academy, Pune

Alekar started writing at the age of 19 as a chemistry graduation, though most of his early work were short plays. Many of his plays are set around Pune Brahmin society, highlighting their narrow mindedness and subsequently he ventured into small-town politics with Doosra Samna (1989). Mahanirvan (1973) (The Dread Departure) finds black humour through Hindu death rites in Brahmins and its overt seriousness is today Alekar's best-known early work and has since been performed in Bengali, Hindi, Dongri, Konkani and Gujarati. It was originally a one-act play and he had later expanded it at Patel's insistence.  It was first staged on 22 November 1974 at the Bharat Natya Mandir, by the Theatre Academy, Pune and was revived in 1999 for its 25th anniversary, and was performed at the same venue, with most of the original cast intact.

Mickey Ani Memsaheb (1974) was his first full-length script. With the exception of his Mahapoor (1975), he directed all of his own plays. Alekar's Begum Barve (1979) is regarded as a classic of contemporary Marathi theatre. It deals with the eponymous female impersonator's memories and fantasies. After his musical company closed down, a minor singer-actor starts selling incense sticks on the street and gets exploited by his employer. One day his fantasies get enmeshed with those of a pair of clerks who were his regular customers, and those fantasies get almost fulfilled. The play staged in Rajasthani, Punjabi, Gujarati, Bengali, Konkani, Tamil and Kannada. In 2009, 30 years after its first production, the play returned to Mumbai with its original cast of Chandrakant Kale, and Mohan Aghashe.

Alekar's other plays are Bhajan, Bhinta, Walan, Shanivar-Ravivar (1982), Dusra Samna (1987), and Atireki (1990). The first three are one-act plays. Atireki is marked by irony, wit, and tangential take-offs from absurd premises. In January 2011 a book of short plays translated/adapted into Marathi by Satish Alekar published by M/s Neelkanth Prakashan, Pune under the title "Adharit Ekankika".

 In 2022 all the plays of Satish Alekar including short plays in Marathi were published as a new edition by the Popular Prakashan, Mumbai and these nine books are now available online for sale.
https://www.amazon.in/Satish-Yanchya-Natkancha-%E0%A4%AF%E0%A4%BE%E0%A4%82%E0%A4%9A%E0%A5%8D%E0%A4%AF%E0%A4%BE-%E0%A4%A8%E0%A4%BE%E0%A4%9F%E0%A4%95%E0%A4%BE%E0%A4%82%E0%A4%9A%E0%A4%BE/dp/8195832407/ref=sr_1_4?crid=1A4Y8QRNBRYKJ&keywords=satish+alekar+books&qid=1679052866&sprefix=Satish+Alekar%2Caps%2C205&sr=8-4

Two Crtique published on plays Mahanirvan (Dread Departure) and Begum Barve in Marathi:

1) "Mahanirvan: Sameeksha aani Sansmarne"  (महानिर्वाण समिक्षा आणि संस्मरणे) (A volume of critique in Marathi  on the play ' Mahanirvan'-Dread Departure Edited by Dr. Rekha Inmadar-Sane published by M/s Rajhans Prakashan, Pune, I Edition Dec 1999, II Edition March 2008, Pages: 254, Price Rs.250/-) The volume first published in 1999 to mark the 25th year run of the production of the play produced by Theatre Academy, Pune directed by Satish Alekar. Volume included 90 pages of the extensive interview of the playwright Satish Alekar.

2) "Begum Barve Vishayee" (बेगम बर्वे विषयी)  (About the play Begum Barve) Edited by Dr. Rekha Inamdar-Sane published in June 2010  by M/s Rajhans Prakashan, Pune,
Pages 169, Price: Rs. 200/- The books has nine articles analysing the text and the performance written by well-known theatre scholars.

Acting reading performance
Aparichit Pu La (अपरिचित पु.लं.),  (2018) a 90 mints acting reading programme on the lesser-known writings of the legendary writer, performer P. L. Deshpande पु.ल.देशपांडे  (1919–2000) produced by Shabda Vedh, Pune (शब्द वेध,पुणे)  to mark the birth centenary of the writer, conceived by Chandrakant Kale, cast: Satish Alekar, Chandrakant Kale and Girish Kulkarni. First show was performed in Pulotsav on 22 November 2018 at Balgamdharva Ranga Mandir, Pune. Since opening of the show in November 2018, performances were staged in Pune, Solapur, Ratnagiri and Mumbai.

Film scripts
Alekar scripted the National Film Award winning Marathi feature film Jait Re Jait in 1977, directed by Jabbar Patel, and later he directed a 13-part Hindi TV serial Dekho Magar Pyarse for Doordarshan in 1985. He scripted the dialogues for the Marathi feature film Katha Don Ganpatravanchi in 1995–96.

Writing for Marathi newspaper
Written a fortnightly column in Marathi for Sunday edition of Loksatta 'Gaganika' January–December 2015. Column is based on Satish Alekar's journey in to Performing Arts since 1965. The column became popular and now the book "Gaganika"  (pages 260+12+ 8 P photos, Hb Rs. 375/- Pb Rs. 300/-based on the column is published on 30 April 2017 by M/s Rajahans Prakashan, Pune 411030.

Awards and recognition
Some of Alekar's plays have been translated and produced in Hindi, Bengali, Tamil, Dogri, Gujarati, Rajasthani, Punjabi, and Konkani. His plays have been included in the National Anthologies published in 2000–01 by the National School of Drama and Sahitya Akademi, Delhi.

 Alekar is the recipient of several national and state awards for his contribution to the field of Theater and Literature. 
 In 1974 his collection of short plays "Zulta Pool (झुलता पूल" received best collection of short plays award from Ministry of Culture, Govt. of Maharashtra.
 In 1975 he received Late Ram Ganesh Gadkari award from the State of Maharashtra for his play Mahanirvan (महानिर्वाण). 
 He received Nandikar Sanman at Calcutta in 1992.
 He received fellowships from the Asian Cultural Council, New York in 1983 to study theatre in the US, and from the Ford Foundation to study Theatre of South Asia in 1988.
 He received in 1994 a Sangeet Natak Akademi Award for playwriting from Sangeet Natak Akademi, Delhi (संगीत नाटक अकादमी, दिल्ली).
 Received State Award Best Actor in Comedy Role played in Marathi film Katha Don Ganpatravanchi (कथा दोन गणपतरावांची ), Directed by Arun Khopkar (1997)
 Received Vi Va Shirwadkar award (Poet Kusumagraj) for playwriting by Natya Parishad, Nasik in 2007
 Received Life Time Achievement felicitation (जीवन गौरव)   by Akhil Bharatiya Marathi Natya Parishad, Mumbai in Feb 2012  
 He received the award "Padamshree" (पद्मश्री) conferred by the President of India in January 2012.
 In December 2013 Satish Alekar received Balaraj Sahani Memorial Award (बलराज सहानी स्मृती पुरस्कार) in Pune for his contribution over last 40 years as a playwright, director and actor.
 In 2014 he was awarded Poet and Playwright "Aarati Prabhu Award (कवि आरती प्रभू )" by Baba Vardam Theatres, Kudal, Dist. Sindhudurg.
 2017 Tanveer Sanman (तन्वीर सन्मान) Prestigious national award for the lifetime contribution to the field of Theatre constituted by veteran actor Dr. Shriram Lagoo through  Rupavedh Pratisthan, Pune. Award function was held in Pune on 9 December 2017. 
 2018 Book GAGANIKA (गगनिका) received Advt Tryambakrao Shirole award for best non fiction (उत्कृष्ट ललित गद्य) by Maharashtra Sahitya Parishad, Pune 2022 "Natavarya Prabhakar Panshikar Jeevan Gaurav Puraskar" for the year 2021-22 by the State Government of Maharashtra highest Cultural Life Achievement Award.
 2022 “ Vishnudas Bhave Medal prestigious award by Natyavidyamandir Samitee, SangliNatakkar Satish Alekar(Playwright Satish Alekar), a 90-minute film by Atul Pethe about Alekar's life and work was released in 2008.

Works
 The dread departure (Mahanirvan), tr. by Gauri Deshpande. Seagull Books, 1989. .
 
 "Collected Plays of Satish Alekar. OUP, Delhi 2010, "
 "Collected Plays of Satish Alekar"
https://www.amazon.in/Collected-Plays-Satish-Alekar-Departure/dp/019806988X/ref=sr_1_1?crid=4INA191XY0PG&keywords=satish+alekar+books&qid=1676993517&sprefix=satish+alekar%2Caps%2C3298&sr=8-1
 Satish Alekar all plays in Martathi. A set of nine books in Marathi published by Popular Prakashan Mumbai in 2022. Here is the link
https://www.amazon.in/Satish-Yanchya-Natkancha-%E0%A4%AF%E0%A4%BE%E0%A4%82%E0%A4%9A%E0%A5%8D%E0%A4%AF%E0%A4%BE-%E0%A4%A8%E0%A4%BE%E0%A4%9F%E0%A4%95%E0%A4%BE%E0%A4%82%E0%A4%9A%E0%A4%BE/dp/8195832407/ref=sr_1_2?crid=4INA191XY0PG&keywords=satish+alekar+books&qid=1676993517&sprefix=satish+alekar%2Caps%2C3298&sr=8-2

 Personal life 
Satish Alekar belongs to City of Pune. His parents Late Usha and Vasant Alekar were freedom fighters, both involved in India's 1942 movement. Satish Alekar married Anita (Abhyankar) in 1976. They have a son MIKIN. Anita died in 2007. He has one younger brother Sudhir and one sister Bharati. Presently he is living in Pune with his son Mikin.

Academic Honour
Following Scholars have completed their Ph.D. research on the creative contribution of Satish Alekar as a playwright.

 Sarjerao Rankhamb, Deglur, awarded Ph.D. by SPPU for the research “नाटककार सतीश आळेकर: एक आकलन”, under the guidance of Dr. Manohar Jadhav, Marathi Department, SPPU in July 2019.
 Smita Rambhau Shinde, Sinnar was awarded her Ph.D. on February 25, 2020 by SPPU for her research on the topic: Reality and Fantasy in the selected plays of Satish Alekar under the guidance of Dr. Rohit Kavle, Sangamner College, Sagamner.      
 Sapanprit: Semiotic Universe of Selected Plays of Satish Alekar and Swarajbir, Central University of Punjab, Bhatinda under the guidance of Dr. Ramanpreet Kaur. 
 Neeraj Balasaheb Borse, Dr. Babasaheb Ambedkar Marathwada University, Aurangabad submitted his Ph.D. thesis on the subject “सतीश आळेकर यांच्या नाटकांचा संहितालक्षी आणि प्रयोलक्षी अभ्यास “under the guidance of Dr. Chandrasekhar Kanse, Sirsala, Beed

Acting in plays

 1971: As young Man in a short play "Ek Zulta Pool" directed by himself for Intercollegiate Short Play Competition
 1974: As the son "Nana" in play "Mahanirvan" directed by himself for Theatre Academy, Pune in more than 100 shows
 1979: As Javadekar in play "Begum Barve" directed by himselh for Theatre Academy, Pune
 1982: Short play "Boat Futli" Directed by Samar Nakhate for Theatre Academy, Pune.
 1980: As husband in "Shanwar Raviwar" directed by himself for Theatre Academy, Pune

Acting in Hindi films (character roles)

 Ye Kahani Nahi (1984) Dir. Biplav Rai ChowdharyDevi Ahilya (2002) Dir. Nachiket Patwardhan
 Dumkata (2007) Dir. Amol Palekar
 Aiyaa (2012) Dir. Sachin Kundalkar
 Dekh Tamasha Desk (2014) Dir. Feroz Abbas Khan
 Thackeray- A biopic on Shiv Sena Founder Balasaheb Thackeray (2018) as Jayprakash Narayan  Dir by Abhijit Panse (released on 23 Jan 2019)
 83 (2019) a film on Indian Cricket Team's win in 1983 World Cup as Sheshrao Wankhede, Dir Kabir Khan, Produced by Vishnuvardhan Induri and Madhu Mantena Varma (released on December 24, 2021 all over)
 The Suspect (2022) as Dayanand Bharadvaj, Police Commissioner, Dir Samir Karnik, Maverick Pictures, Mumbai (in Making)

Acting in Marathi films /Web Series (character roles)Aakrit (1981) Dir. Amol Palekar
 Umbartha (1982) Dir. Jabbar Patel Dhyas Parva (2001)Dir Amol Palekar
 Dr. Babasaheb Ambedkar (1991) Dir. Jabbar Patel
 Ek Hota Vidushak (1992) Dir. Jabbar Patel
 Katha Don Ganpatravaanchee (1996) Dir. Arun Khopkar (role of Judge which was awarded for the Best Actor (Comedy), Govt. of Maharashtra)
 Kadachit (2007)  as a Neurosurgeon Dir. Chandrakant Kulkarni
 Chintoo (2012), as Colonel Kaka, Dir.Shrirang Godbole
 Chintoo 2 (Khajinyachi Chittarkatha) as Colonel Kaka  2013 Dir.Shrirang Godbole
 Hovoon Jaudyaa- We Are On! (2013) Dir. Amol Palekar
 Mhais (2013) Dir. Shekhar Naik
 Aajachaa Diwas Maazaa (2013) Dir. Chandrakant Kulkarni
 Yeshwantrao Chavan – Katha Eka Vadalachi (2014) Dir. Jabbar Patel
 Deul Band (2015) Dir. Praveen Tarade
  Welcome Zindagi (2015) Dir. Umesh Ghadge
 High Way-Ek Selfie Aar Paar (2015) Dir: Umesh Kulkarni
 Rajwade and Sons as Rajwade (2015) Dir. Sachin Kundalkar
 audyana Balasaheb! (2015) Dir. Girish Kulkarni (Released in October 2016 through Zee Cinema)
 Ventilator (2016) Movie as Bhau, Dir. Rajesh Mapuskar, Produced by Priyanka Chopra, World Premier on 23 Oct 2016 during MAMI Festival in Mumbai (National Awardee Film)
  Chi. Va. Chi. Sou. Ka (2017) as Bhudargadkar, Dir. Paresh Mokashi, Produced by Zee Cinema (released on 19 May 2017) Mala Kahich Problem Naahi as Father (2017) Dir. Sameer Vidhwans, Produced by Filmy Keeda Entertainment, Mumbai (released on 11 August 2017)Mee Shivaji Park (2017) as Satish Joshi, Dir. Mahesh Waman Manjrekar, Produced by Gouri Films, Pune (Released on 18 October 2018)
 Thackeray (2018) Biopic film on Balasaheb Thackeray (Hindi/Marathi) as Jayprakash Narayan, Dir Abhijit Panse, Produced by Raut'Ters Entertainment  (released on 23 Jan 2019)
 Bhai: Vyakti ki Valli Part I (2018) a Biopic (made in two parts) on Pu La Deshpande as Ramakant Deshpande Dir Mahesh Manjrekar Produced by The Great Maratha Entertainment (released on 4 Jan 2019)
 Bhai: Vyakti ki Valli Part II (2018) a Biopic on Pu La Deshpande as Ramakant Deshpande Dir Mahesh Manjrekar Produced by The Great Maratha Entertainment (Released on 8 Feb 2019)
 Smile Please (2019) as Appa Joshi (father), Directed by Vikrum Phadnis Produced by Nisha Shah and Sanika Gandhi.( released on 19 July 2019) streaming on Prime Video
 " Panchak " 2019) as Bal Kaka. Directed by Jayant Jathar, Produced by RnM Films (by Shriram Nene and Madhuri Dixit) ( selected in the competition for Marathi feature in 21st Pune International Film Festival. To be released around April 2023).
 Pet-Puran (2021) as Lt. Col. Jarasandh Wagh(Retd) Web Series for Sony Liv Directed by Dyanesh Zoting (Season I, released on SonyLIV - May 6, 2022)season II is scheduled in 2023
 Ek Don Teen Char - एक दोन तीन चार (2022) as Dr. Vivek Joshi Marathi film by Varun Narvekar, Produced by Jio Studios (to be released in 2023)
 Kalsutra- कालसूत्र' (2022)Web Series as Shriram Bidari, Kanha Production, Directed by Bhimrao Mude(in making)Produbced by Manjiri Subodh Bhave for Jio Studio.

Acting in TV commercials and Short Films

Products:
TV Cable Co.: Tata Sky (2010)
Car: Honda Ameze (2013)for Appostophe, Mumbai
Cell Phone Company:Idea -Telephone Exchange (2013) for Chrome Pictures, Mumbai
  New York Life Insurance (2012)
Online Purchase : SNAPDEAL (2016) for Chrome Pictures,Mumbai
 Fiama Di Willis Body Wash (2018) for Apostrophe Films, Mumbai Dir Kaushik Sarkar Link: https://www.youtube.com/watch?v=-WZyvU0n68k
 Reunion Episode 3 Language: Marathi   (2018) Pickle Brand Presented by Ravetkar Group, Pune Dir Varun Narvekar (short Film) Link:  https://www.youtube.com/watch?v=d5uzHiMeMAc
 maateech swapna  मातीचं स्वप्न  (2018) a short film in Marathi for Chitale Bandhu Mithaiwale (चितळे बंधू), Produced by Multimedia Tools,Pune Directed by Varun Narvekar
 Reunion for Ravetkar Group (2018) : A three minutes short film made about the awareness for early treatment in Brain Stroke made by Ruby Hall Clinic, Pune Link: https://www.youtube.com/watch?v=d5uzHiMeMAc&t=25s
 रुची पालट/Fusion Food/ Chitale Bandhoo (2019): for Chitale Bandhoo, Pune Link: https://www.youtube.com/watch?v=9vnnp5zq0zY
  Cotten King Brand- Just Strech Your Limits (2020) Directed by Varun Narvekar Link: https://www.youtube.com/watch?v=iqJirxo_0MQ
 Red Label Tea (2021) Ad film  for Hindustan Unilever directed by Gajraj Rao for Code Red Films, Mumbai Link in Telugu :https://www.youtube.com/watch?v=_HM_kaGhAW0
 Short Film ‘Fala (फळा - तिमिरातून तेजाकडे 2021), Produced by Kc Productions, Dir. Mangesh Jagtap

References

 
 
 
 
  Collected Plays of Satish Alekar. OUP, Delhi 2009, \
 "Mahanirvan: Sameeksha aani Sansmarne" (A volume of critique in Marathi  on the play, Edited by Dr. Rekha Inmadar-Sane published by M/s Rajhans Prakashan, Pune,I Edition Dec 1999, II Edition March 2008, Pages: 254, Price Rs.250/-)
"Begum Barve Vishayee" (About the play Begum Barve) Edited by Dr. Rekha Inamdar-Sane published in June 2010  by M/s Rajhans Prakashan, Pune, Pages 169, Price: Rs. 200/- The book has nine articles analysing the text and the performance written by well-known theatre scholars.
 Link to the Short Film Reunion Episode 3 (2018) https://www.youtube.com/watch?v=d5uzHiMeMAc

External links
 Satish Alekar website
 Memory by Satish Alekar at Little magazine''
 Documentary film on Satish Alekar directed by Atul Pethe (2008,90 mints)
 Book Review of Gaganika by Shanta Gokhale for Pune Mirror 1 June 2017
 Look back in humour

Indian theatre directors
Indian male dramatists and playwrights
Marathi-language writers
1949 births
Living people
Indian male stage actors
Academic staff of Savitribai Phule Pune University
Asian Cultural Council grantees
Recipients of the Sangeet Natak Akademi Award
Male actors in Marathi theatre
Dramatists and playwrights from Delhi
Tisch School of the Arts faculty
Recipients of the Padma Shri in arts
20th-century Indian male actors
Male actors from Delhi
20th-century Indian dramatists and playwrights